The Forty-fifth Oklahoma Legislature was a meeting of the legislative branch of the government of Oklahoma, composed of the Senate and the House of Representatives. It met in Oklahoma City from January 3, 1995, to January 7, 1997, during the first two years of the first term of Governor Frank Keating. During the first session in 1995, the state legislature passed the first welfare reform law in the nation.

Dates of sessions
Organizational day: January 3, 1995
First session: February 4-May 26, 1995
Second session: February 5-May 31, 1996
Previous: 44th Legislature • Next: 46th Legislature

Party composition

Senate

House of Representatives

Major legislation

Enacted

1995
During the first session in 1995, the state legislature passed the first welfare reform law in the nation.

Leadership

Senate
President Pro Tempore: Stratton Taylor
Republican Minority leader: Howard Hendrick

House of Representatives
 Speaker: Glen D. Johnson, Jr.
 Speaker Pro Tempore: Jim Glover
 Majority Floor Leader: Lloyd Benson
 Republican Minority leader: Larry Ferguson

Members

Senate

Table based on list of all state senators and years served. Senate districts 25, 27, 28, 36, and 53 did not exist in 1995.

House of Representatives

Table based on database of historic members.

See also
Oklahoma state elections, 1994

References

Oklahoma legislative sessions
1995 in Oklahoma
1996 in Oklahoma
1995 U.S. legislative sessions
1996 U.S. legislative sessions